The Venerable  Sidney Edward Lowe  (22 March 1882 – 10 January 1968) was Archdeacon of Bradford from 1934 to 1953.

Lowe was educated at King Edward's School, Birmingham and the University of Birmingham and ordained in 1905. After a  curacy at St James’, Gorton he held incumbencies at Holy Trinity, Colne St Peter's, Rochdale, All Saints’, Bradford,  All Saints Otley and St Oswald's Guiseley

before his years as an Archdeacon.

Notes

1882 births
People from Birmingham, West Midlands
People educated at King Edward's School, Birmingham
Alumni of the University of Birmingham
Archdeacons of Bradford
1968 deaths